The 2022–23 season is the 121st season in the existence of AFC Bournemouth. It is the club's first campaign back in the Premier League since 2019–20, following promotion in the previous season. In addition to the league, they are also competing in the FA Cup and the EFL Cup.

Transfers

In

Out

Loans in

Loans out

Pre-season and friendlies
The Cherries announced their first pre-season friendly on June 2, against Real Sociedad. A second announcement was made twelve days later, against Bristol City. A pre-season training camp in Portugal, along with two matches against Sheffield Wednesday and Braga was also confirmed.

Competitions

Overall record

Premier League

League table

Results summary

Results by round

Matches

On 16 June 2022, the Premier League fixtures were released.

Mid-season break for 2022 FIFA World Cup

FA Cup

The club joined the competition in the third round and were drawn at home to Burnley. They exited the competition in the third round after losing to the Championship side.

EFL Cup

Bournemouth entered the competition in the second round and were drawn away to Norwich City. Bournemouth were eliminated from the competition after losing to Newcastle United in the fourth round.

Notes

References

A.F.C. Bournemouth
AFC Bournemouth seasons
English football clubs 2022–23 season